John Haddow McSeveney (8 February 1931 – 12 December 2020) was a Scottish football player and manager.

A winger, he joined Newport County in 1957 from Cardiff City. He made 172 league appearances for Newport, scoring 51 goals. In 1961, he joined Hull City. He died in December 2020 at the age of 89.

References

1931 births
2020 deaths
Sportspeople from Shotts
Scottish footballers
Association football wingers
Hamilton Academical F.C. players
Sunderland A.F.C. players
Cardiff City F.C. players
Newport County A.F.C. players
Hull City A.F.C. players
Scottish football managers
Barnsley F.C. managers
English Football League players
League of Ireland managers
Home Farm F.C. coaches
Waterford F.C. managers
Sheffield United F.C. non-playing staff
Nottingham Forest F.C. non-playing staff
Footballers from North Lanarkshire